Henri Kowalski (April 1, 1841; Paris France — July 8, 1916; Bordeaux, France) was a French pianist and composer. Born in Paris to a French mother and Polish father, Kowalski studied piano at the Paris Conservatoire with Michele Carafa and Samuel David; although he was asked to leave in 1860 for failure to attend regularly. His work includes the opera Gilles de Bretagne (1877). A regular traveller, he lived in Australia from 1885 to 1896. He published in 1872 his impressions of his travels in the United States, which includes a list of his musical compositions.

References

Further reading
"Kowalski, Henri (1841–1916)". National Library of Australia.

1841 births
1916 deaths
19th-century French male classical pianists
20th-century French male classical pianists